The Toyota Boshoku Sunshine Rabbits are a basketball team based in Kariya, Aichi, playing in the Women's Japan Basketball League.

Toyota Boshoku Sunshine Rabbits uses Wing Arena Kariya as its home arena.

Notable players

Coaches
Mitsuaki Sato

References

External links
Official website

Basketball teams in Japan
Basketball teams established in 1980